Tetilla casula, the volcano sponge, is a species of demosponge from the south coast of South Africa.

Description 
The volcano sponge consists of a  pale yellow to light green-grey hemispherical head on a conical or umbrella-like expansion that is embedded in the sand.

The head is rough and covered in lines of projecting spicules. These projections tend to be the longest at the bottom, where they are continuous with those of the conical expansion. Those at the top, by contrast, tend to be short and upright. Slightly raised semi-spherical oscules are clustered at the top.

The conical expansion is smooth and thins towards the circumference, where they form a circular fringed border. This is mostly concealed by the sand in which this species lives. It is made of long overlapping spicules arranged in parallel bundles. They radiate from a common center in continuation with the lowest spicules of the head, extending downwards into the sand.

Pores mostly occur on the upper part of the head while vents are found in the larger polygonal interspaces at the base. The conival expansion has a few pores and vents.

Spicules 
Five kinds of spicules make up the skeleton of this species. These are:

 Long spicules (average length:) with a delicate, smooth shaft with a pointed end on the interior end and a three pronged forked end pointing outwards.
 Long needle-like spicules.
 Short, stout and curved spicules.
 Minute spicules with a highly flexible shaft. They end in point on the interior end and a two or three pronged fork on the outer end.
 Minute double hooked c- or s-shaped spicules.

Skeleton 
Only the two longest spicule types are found in the conical expansion. The fringe of this expansion is formed solely of the forked ends of the longest spicules. The three smaller spicule types are found only in the head, where they dominate. Shorter versions of the spicules that make up the expansion are also found in this region.

Distribution and habitat 
This species is known from the south coast of South Africa. While it has been found between KwaZulu-Natal and the Cape of Good Hope, it is most common between Gqeberha and the Cape. It is found growing on sandy substrates.

References 

Demospongiae
Species described in 1871
Biodiversity of South Africa